Povl Gerlow (19 August 1881 – 1 June 1959) was a Danish sport shooter who competed in the 1912 Summer Olympics and in the 1920 Summer Olympics.

He was born in Vig, Trundholm, Zealand and died in Copenhagen.

In 1912 at the Stockholm Games he participated in the following events:

 50 metre team small-bore rifle – fifth place
 25 metre small-bore rifle – 31st place
 50 metre rifle, prone – 38th place
 300 metre free rifle, three positions – 60th place
 300 metre military rifle, three positions – 74th place

Eight years later he finished eighth in the 600 metre military rifle, prone competition at the Antwerp Games.

References

1881 births
1959 deaths
Danish male sport shooters
ISSF rifle shooters
Olympic shooters of Denmark
Shooters at the 1912 Summer Olympics
Shooters at the 1920 Summer Olympics